Uspantán is a municipality in the Guatemalan department of El Quiché. It is one of the largest municipalities of El Quiché and stretches from the mountainous highlands in the South to the tropical lowlands in the North.  The municipal seat is in Villa de San Miguel Uspantán with a population of 2,800. The birthplace of Nobel Peace Prize winner Rigoberta Menchú, a community named Laj Chimel, is located Uspantán not far from the municipal seat.  Completion of paving on the road in from Chichicastenango has brought a small tourist boom to the town.

The municipality includes the pre-Columbian Maya archaeological site of Chitinamit, believed to be Jakawitz, the first capital of the K'iche' Maya.

Notes

References

External links

Municipalities of the Quiché Department